Öreskoga is a fictional town in Sweden, where most of the fictional novels and later TV Series Bert-diaries take place. The main character of the novels, Bert Ljung, lives in Öreskoga, at Klosterstigen 18. In the books, he lives in a three floors high house with six flats, while he in the TV series live in a high-rise apartment building, similar to those in Hagalund. The name Öreskoga is a portmanteau of the hometowns of the authors of the Bert-diaries - Sören Olsson's hometown, Örebro, and Anders Jacobsson's hometown, Karlskoga. Öreskoga is located somewhere between Karlskoga-Örebro.

Geography
Outside Öreskoga is the lake of Nöckeln, where Bert and his friends are swimming and bathing in the summertime. The cover of the book Bert och badbrudarna depicts Bert swimming in the lake. Öreskoga also has a town park, where Bert and Nadja meet below the old oak at the end of Berts dagbok, and where Bert and Emilia walk together in the summertime in Berts bravader.

Politics and society
It's not mentioned in which municipality Öreskoga is, but Berts vidare betraktelser and Berts bravader refer to local government official "Svante Brylén". Berts bryderier refers to a newspaper named Öreskogas Allehanda.

Schools
Beckaskolan is a school with the grade levels 1-9 where Bert and his class friends are. The comics often depicts a try squared schoolhouse. The 1994 TV-series shows the "mellanstadium" and "högstadium". Someone has written "bögstadium" (Swedish: gay stage) at the front door.

In the books, class 6 B, Bert's class, has 15 pupils. Klass 6 from Östbergsskolan, consisting of 14 pupils, is merged with Bert's from the 7th grade. The class is then 7-9 A.

In Berts bekymmer, the school is appointed the school in Sweden which has the most mold.

Teachers
"Banan-Boris", Bert's högstadium (High School) chemistry
Malte, Henrik Strutz, head teacher
Sonja Ek, Berts' mellanstadium (Middle School) teacher

Blåsjöskolan
Jungbergska skolan is a mellanstadium school, and Gabriella's school, some kilometers away from Bert's hem. In Berts bekännelser Bert, who is then in the 8th grade, travels there by moped to meet Gabriella who's in the 6th grade. He is disguised as a substitute. From the 7th grade she switches to Beckaskolan.

Jungbergska skolan
Jungbergska skolan is a 1-6-school, and Nadja's school. In Berts första betraktelser, a disco occurs at the school. In the TV series a violin concerto occurs at the school.

From the 7th grade, Nadja switches to Beckaskolan.

Österbergsskolan
Österbergsskolan is the school for the pupils who from the 7th grade are merged with Bert's class.

Sports
In Öreskoga is the sports club Öreskoga-Kamraternas Idrottsförening, where Bert plays soccer, and the name is mentioned in Bert och brorsorna. The boys' team is led by soccer manager Gordon. Berts vidare betraktelser depicts the team playing "Böljas BK". In Berts bravader, Åke recruits 9 year old Charlie to the 14 yer old's team. In Berts bekännelser, it's mentioned how the team fought with the spectators in the first game of an important regional tournament during the previous year, and was suspended for several months. This makes Åke angry, and he steals referee's clothes from a dressing room, and judge a girls game using rugby football rules before facing a black eye in the paus.

In Öreskoga is also Öreskoga Ishockeyklubb, which Åke blames for racism not touching the "black puck" in Berts ytterligare betraktelser, in Berts bryderier they play Bollehult.

See also
Glimmerdagg, the main setting for the Sune series.

References

Fictional populated places in Sweden